Have a Little Faith is the sixth solo studio album by the American soul and gospel singer Mavis Staples, which was released by Alligator Records.

Track listing

Personnel
 Mavis Staples – vocals
 Jim Tullio – acoustic, electric and bass guitars, drums, percussion, backing vocals
 Chris "Hambone" Cameron – organs, clavinet, baritone saxophone, horn samples
 Jim Weider – electric guitar, acoustic slide guitar
 Shawn Christopher – backing vocals
 Yvonne Gage – backing vocals
 Arno Lucas – backing vocals
 Rene Monahan – backing vocals
 Stevie Robinson – backing vocals
 Michael Scott – backing vocals

Additional musicians
John Martyn – Mutron guitar (track 1)
 David Resnick – acoustic slide guitar (track 1), electric guitar (track 7)
 John Scully – synthesizer (track 2), strings (track 9)
 Bob Lizik – bass guitar (track 2)
 Hank Guaglianone – drums (tracks 2, 6 and 11)
Greg Marsh – percussion (track 2)
 Erik Scott – bass guitar (track 3)
 Larry Beers – drums (track 3)
 John Giblin – bass and electric guitar (track 4)
 David Onderdonk – acoustic guitar (track 4)
 Mark Walker – percussion (track 4)
 John Rice – electric guitar, dobro, bouzouki, fiddle (track 5)
 Foley McCreary – bass guitar (track 6)
 Pops Staples – electric guitar (track 7 and 10)
 Maurice Houston – bass guitar (tracks 7 and 10)
 Richard Gibbs – organ (track 7), synthesizer (track 10)
 Tim Austin – drums (tracks 7, 8 and 10)
 Will Crosby – guitar (track 8)
 Jack Chatman – bass guitar (track 8)
 Bill Ruppert – electric guitar (tracks 9 and 11)
 Matt Walker – drums (track 9)
 Mark Skyer – electric guitar (track 10)
 Alan Berliant – bass guitar (track 11)
 Lew London – acoustic slide guitar (track 12)
 Paul Mertens – bass harmonica (track 12)
The Dixie Hummingbirds – backing vocals (track 1)
 Chicago Music Community Choir  – backing vocals (track 11)

Technical personnel
 Jim Tullio and Mavis Staples – producers
 Mavis Staples – executive producer
 Doug McBride – additional engineer
 Maurice Houston – additional engineer
 Joshua Cutsinger – additional engineer
 John Giblin – additional engineer
 Chris Cameron – additional engineer
 Foley McCreary – additional engineer
 Chris Steinmetz – additional engineer
 Randy Friel – additional engineer
 Shelly Yakus – mixing and mastering
 Michael Newman – mixing and mastering
 Scott Steiner – mixing (track 11)
 Jim Tullio – mixing (track 11)

References

External links
 

Mavis Staples albums
2004 albums
Alligator Records albums